Spring Grove Dam is an A roller compacted concrete (RCC) dam with an earth embankment located on the Mooi River in the KwaZulu-Natal north west of the town of Nottingham Road in South Africa. Construction commenced in 2011 and was officially opened on 19 November 2013. It has a full capacity of 138.5 million cubic meters of water and serves primarily for Municipal and industrial use.

See also
List of reservoirs and dams in South Africa

References 

 Mooi-Mgeni Transfer Scheme – Phase 2

Dams in South Africa
Dams completed in 2013
21st-century architecture in South Africa